Ougapia spaldingi is a species of air-breathing land snail, a terrestrial pulmonate gastropod mollusk in the family Rhytididae. This species is endemic to Australia.

References

Rhytididae
Gastropods of Australia
Taxonomy articles created by Polbot
Taxobox binomials not recognized by IUCN